The following is a list of notable deaths in December 1989.

Entries for each day are listed alphabetically by surname. A typical entry lists information in the following sequence:
 Name, age, country of citizenship at birth, subsequent country of citizenship (if applicable), reason for notability, cause of death (if known), and reference.

December 1989

1
Alvin Ailey, 58, American dancer and choreographer, AIDS.
Michał Antoniewicz, 92, Polish Olympic equestrian (1928).
André Charles Biéler, 93, Swiss-born Canadian painter.
Billy Lyall, 36, Scottish singer, keyboard player, and flautist, AIDS.
Johan Melander, 79, Norwegian banker.
Nikolai Patolichev, 81, Soviet politician.
Bill Stout, 62, American journalist, cardiac arrest.
Mitchell Ucovich, 74, American football player.
William Vandivert, 77, American photographer.

2
Harland Bartholomew, 100, American urban planner.
Norman Davis, 76, New Zealand-British literary scholar.
Keith Ewert, 71, Australian politician.
Oldřich Hanč, 74, Czechoslovak Olympic speed skater (1936).
Delmas Carl Hill, 83, American judge.
Ruth Mary Reynolds, 73, American political activist.
Richard Shannon, 69, American actor.
William Taylour, 85, British archaeologist.
Charles Zwar, 78, Australian-English musician.

3
Sourou-Migan Apithy, 76, Beninese politician, president of Dahomey (1964–1965).
Mario Astorri, 69, Italian footballer.
Ingmar Bengtsson, 69, Swedish musicologist.
Connie B. Gay, 75, American country musician, cancer.
Andreas Gulbrandsen, 83, Norwegian chess player.
José López, 75, Spanish footballer.
Boris Stepanovich Lukoshkov, 67, Soviet artist.
Fernando Martín, 27, Spanish professional basketball player, five-time swimming champion, traffic collision.
Jean-Paul Moulinot, 77, French actor.
Alexander Obukhov, 71, Russian physicist.
Carlo Rim, 86, French filmmaker.
Nihal Silva, 35, Sri Lankan comedian and actor, shot.
Paul Wei Ping-ao, 60, Chinese actor.

4
Elisabeth Biebl, 74, German singer and actress.
Gerald Carson, 90, American social historian.
Frank Herzegh, 82, American inventor of the tubeless tire.
Émile Janssens, 87, Belgian colonial official and military officer.
Elwyn Jones, Baron Elwyn-Jones, 80, Welsh politician.
Steve Lembo, 63, American baseball player.
Colin MacKay, 81, Australian footballer.
Kathleen Manners, Duchess of Rutland, 95, English aristocrat.
Angelo Ruggiero, 49, American mobster (Gambino crime family), cancer.
May Swenson, 76, American poet.
Jim Vipond, 73, Canadian sports journalist.

5
Juan Manuel Acuña, 68, Chilean footballer.
Edoardo Amaldi, 81, Italian physicist, coined the term "neutrino".
Benny Binion, 85, American gambler and criminal, heart failure.
Nathan Huggins, 62, American historian.
Per Hurum, 79, Norwegian sculptor.
Sofiya Kalistratova, 82, Soviet lawyer and human rights activist.
Li Keran, 82, Chinese artist, heart attack.
Arno H. Luehman, 78, American general.
George Machin, 66, British politician.
Tadeusz Miksa, 63, Polish footballer.
John Pritchard, 68, English conductor, music director of the San Francisco Opera, lung cancer.
George Selden, 60, American author.

6
Joyce Howard Barrell, 72, English composer.
Frances Bavier, 86, American actress, heart failure.
Cecil Cathers, 88, Canadian politician.
C. L. Dellums, 89, American labor activist.
Sammy Fain, 87, American composer, and musician (Alice in Wonderland, Peter Pan, The Incredible Mr. Limpet), heart attack.
David Hardman, 88, British politician.
Rolf Johannesson, 89, German naval admiral.
Marc Lépine, 25, Canadian mass murderer (École Polytechnique massacre), suicide by gunshot.
Art Parks, 78, American baseball player.
John Payne, 77, American actor, congestive heart failure.
Ćamil Sijarić, 75, Yugoslav writer, traffic collision.
Gaston Van Roy, 73, Belgian Olympic sports shooter (1952).

7
Haystacks Calhoun, 55, American professional wrestler, diabetes.
Carlos DeLuna, 27, American convicted murderer, execution by lethal injection.
Phil Dokes, 34, American football player, heart failure.
Nellie B. Eales, 100, British zoologist.
Hans Hartung, 85, German-French abstract painter and soldier.
Lucien Le Guével, 74, French racing cyclist.
Stuart Novins, 75, American television journalist, respiratory failure.
Werner Ranck, 85, German general.
Sirima, 25, English singer, stabbed.
Vadim Spiridonov, 45, Soviet actor and film director, heart failure.
Eric Sykes, 83, English cricketer.

8
Albert Barrett, 86, English footballer.
Szymon Datner, 87, Polish historian and Holocaust survivor.
Max Grundig, 81, German businessman (Grundig).
Mykola Livytskyi, 82, Soviet Ukrainian politician, president in exile (since 1967).
Birger Malling, 105, Norwegian physician.
Philip McNairy, 78, American Episcopalian prelate.
Jack Rankin, 75, New Zealand rugby player.
Stanley Steingut, 69, American politician, lung cancer.
Lee Watson, 62-63, American lighting designer.
Sir John Wedgwood, 2nd Baronet, 82, British industrialist and hereditary peer.

9
Brett Austin, 30, New Zealand Olympic swimmer (1984).
Edward J. Bloustein, 64, American academic administrator.
Gunnar Bøe, 72, Norwegian politician and economist.
Henry J. Degenkolb, 75-76, American structural engineer.
William P. Ennis, 85, American general.
Bob Friedman, 68, American football player.
Basil Hayward, 61, English footballer.
Takeshi Kaikō, 58, Japanese writer, esophageal cancer.
Doug Scovil, 62, American football player.
S. Somasundaram, 70, Indian musician.
R. G. Springsteen, 85, American film director.

10
Frank Baker, 71, English footballer.
Sam Barkas, 79, English footballer.
Loys Choquart, 69, Swedish jazz musician and bandleader.
George Edmonds, 96, English footballer.
Nico Gardener, 83, British bridge player.
Frank Gulotta, 82, American judge, diabetes.
Huang Zhen, 80, Chinese politician.
Frederick Hedges, 86, Canadian Olympic rower (1928).
Robin Hughes, 69, British actor, liver disease.
Howard Lynch, 87, American football coach.
Leland McParland, 92, American politician.
Charles Potter, 82, English entomologist.
Steve Sebo, 75, American sportsman and coach.
Sir John Stevens, 89, British naval admiral.
Harold Thomas, 75, Welsh rugby player.

11
Agu Aarna, 74, Soviet Estonian chemist.
Allez France, 19, American Thoroughbred racehorse.
Carlos Almaraz, 48, Mexican-American artist, AIDS.
John Buxton, 76, British ornithologist.
Lindsay Crosby, 51, American actor, son of Bing Crosby, suicide by gunshot.
Louise Dahl-Wolfe, 94, American photographer.
Alfred Ferraz, 82, French architect.
Gholamreza Ghodsi, 64, Iranian poet.
Madge Miller Green, 89, American politician.
Gösta Kriland, 72, Swedish artist.
Howard Lang, 78, English actor.

12
Nini Bulterijs, 60, Belgian composer.
Sid Colin, 74, English scriptwriter.
Helen Creighton, 90, Canadian folklorist.
Bill Kennedy, 77, Scottish footballer.
Fernand Le Heurteur, 84, French Olympic runner (1936).
Suihō Tagawa, 90, Japanese manga artist.

13
Lidija Auza, 75, Soviet Latvian artist.
Paul Crowe, 65, American football player.
Peter de la Mare, 69, New Zealand chemist.
Michele Fanelli, 82, Italian Olympic runner (1932).
Sammy Lerner, 86, Romanian-born American songwriter, cancer.
Roderick Mackenzie, 4th Earl of Cromartie, 85, Scottish hereditary peer.
Jack Murphy, 63, American politician.
Stan Randall, 81, Canadian politician.
Jack Showell, 74, Australian footballer.

14
Reuben Bennett, 75, Scottish footballer.
Robert D. Blue, 91, American politician, governor of Iowa (1945–1949), stroke.
Ruth Dobson, 71, Australian diplomat.
Ants Eskola, 81, Soviet Estonian actor.
Gerry Healy, 76, British political activist.
Seiichi Katsumata, 81, Japanese politician.
Jock Mahoney, 70, American actor and stuntman, stroke.
Frederick Nolting, 78, American diplomat.
Laurie Pavitt, 75, British politician.
Georges Poitou, 63, French mathematician.
Andrei Sakharov, 68, Soviet nuclear physicist, dissident, and human rights activist, Nobel Prize recipient (1975), dilated cardiomyopathy.

15
Anders Andersson, 52, Swedish ice hockey player.
Ben Barzman, 79, Canadian journalist and screenwriter.
Emile de Antonio, 70, American documentarian, heart attack.
Charles Holland, 81, British racing cyclist.
Mikhail Kuznetsov, 76, Soviet flying ace.
Philly Lutaaya, 38, Ugandan musician, AIDS.
Slavko Mijušković, 77, Yugoslav historian.
Arnold Moss, 79, American actor, lung cancer.
Diptendu Pramanick, 79, Indian film personality.
José Gonzalo Rodríguez Gacha, 42, Colombian drug lord (Medellín Cartel), shot.
Ali Şen, 80, Turkish actor.
Vanja Sutlić, 64, Yugoslav philosopher.
Edward Underdown, 81, English actor.

16
Robert E. Cox, 72, American optical engineer, emphysema.
Margaret Barr Fulton, 89, Scottish occupational therapist.
Oscar Alfredo Gálvez, 76, Argentine racing driver, pancreatic cancer.
Beth Gleeson, 46, Australian politician.
Charlie Long, 51, American football player.
Silvana Mangano, 59, Italian actress, dancer, and model. Death from lung cancer, having been left in a coma by a previous surgery.
Umberto Micco, 73, Italian field hockey player.
Gianni Poggi, 68, Italian singer.
Aileen Pringle, 94, American actress of the silent film era.
John Ramsbotham, 83, British Anglican prelate.
Marguerite Rawalt, 94, American lawyer and writer.
Päivö Tarjanne, 86, Finnish diplomat.
René Tavernier, 74, French poet and philosopher.
Lee Van Cleef, 64, American actor (The Good, the Bad and the Ugly, For a Few Dollars More, Escape from New York), heart attack.
Robert Smith Vance, 58, American judge, letter bombing.
Marjorie Westbury, 84, English actress.
Priscilla White, 89, American diabetes researcher, heart attack.

17
Gilbert Allart, 87, French Olympic hurdler (1924).
Dame Helen Blaxland, 82, Australian writer and philanthropist.
Edward Boyd, 72-73, Scottish writer.
Georges Burou, 79, French gynecologist, drowned.
Louis W. Dawson, 93, American insurance executive and lawyer.
Zeb Eaton, 69, American baseball player.
Gustav Engel, 96, German historian.
Ghalib Halasa, 57, Jordanian writer.
Neville Hawkes, 49, South African cricketer.
Josephine Hill, 90, American actress.
Little Sonny Jones, 58, American jazz singer, heart failure.
J. Alastair Montgomerie, 74-75, Scottish businessman.
Sir Charles Norris, 89, British naval admiral.
Asen Panchev, 83, Bulgarian footballer.
Eddie Rowe, 69, English cricketer.
Luciano Salce, 67, Italian film director and actor.
Albert Coady Wedemeyer, 92, American general, World War II veteran, and anti-communist ally of the Kuomintang.
William Wiswesser, 75, American chemist.
Bobby Zahiruddin, 81, Indian cricketer.
Miles Zimmerman, 71, American politician.

18
Ewen Bain, 64, Scottish cartoonist.
Brad Beckman, 24, American football player, traffic collision.
Olwen Brogan, 89, British archaeologist.
Esmond Unwin Butler, 67, Canadian diplomat.
Bobby Capó, 67, Puerto Rican musician, heart attack.
Peter Thomas Dunican, 71, British structural engineer.
Arthur Haddy, 83, English recording engineer.
Sir George Harvie-Watt, 86, British politician.
Sydney Irving, 71, British politician.
Enar Josefsson, 73, Swedish Olympic skier (1952).
Jack Kilpatrick, 72, English ice hockey player.
Bill Lindau, 86, American racing driver.
Robert E. Robinson, 42, American lawyer, letter bombing.
Jerzy Rutkowski, 75, Polish political activist.
William Saltonstall, 84, American educator.
Stanley Senanayake, 72, Sri Lankan police officer.
Norbert Staudt, 82, Luxembourgian Olympic water polo player (1928).
Jean Strauss, 77, Luxembourgian Olympic canoeist (1936).

19
Herbert Blaize, 71, Grenadian politician, prime minister (since 1984), prostate cancer. 
Audrey Christie, 77, American actress, emphysema.
Lois Darling, 72, American author and yachtswoman, leukemia.
Halfdan Ditlev-Simonsen Jr., 65, Norwegian Olympic sailor (1956).
Barthold Fles, 87, Dutch-American literary agent and author, diabetes.
Stella Gibbons, 87, English writer.
John Heddle, 46, British politician, suicide by carbon monoxide poisoning.
Floyd Jones, 72, American blues musician.
Óndra Łysohorsky, 84, Czechoslovak poet.
Preben Mahrt, 69, Danish actor.
Kirill Mazurov, 75, Soviet Belarusian politician.
Rafaelito Ortiz, 75, Puerto Rican baseball player.
Georges Rouquier, 80, French filmmaker.
Lucien Spronck, 50, Belgian footballer.

20
Irma Beilke, 85, German singer.
Kurt Böhme, 81, German bass.
Elisheva Cohen, 78, German-born Israeli designer and museum curator.
Leslie Croom, 69, English cricketer.
Gentry Crowell, 57, American politician, suicide by gunshot.
John Currie, 79, Canadian Olympic skier (1932).
William Henry Fitzjohn, 74, Sierra Leonean diplomat.
Jiro Harada, 95, Japanese general.
Donald L. McFaul, 32, American Navy SEAL, killed in battle.
Vasily Pavlov, 94, Russian soldier.
William W. Ullery, 92, American football player.

21
Ján Cikker, 78, Slovak composer.
Inma de Santis, 30, Spanish actress.
Sir Hugh Elliott, 3rd Baronet, 76, British ornithologist and hereditary peer.
Elsie Griffin, 94, English singer.
Harry Hibbs, 47, Canadian musician, cancer.
Aqil Hussain Barlas, 62, Indian lawyer and diplomat, heart failure.
Rotimi Fani-Kayode, 34, Nigerian-English photographer, AIDS.
Henry James Price, 70, Canadian politician.
Ralph Schwamb, 63, American baseball player and convicted murderer.
David Schwartz, 73, American judge.
Soedjatmoko, 67, Indonesian politician and diplomat, cardiac arrest.
Ethel Swanbeck, 96, American politician.
José Zacarías Tallet, 96, Cuban writer.
Dwane Wallace, 78, American aircraft designer.
Edmund Warwick, 82, British actor.

22
Samuel Beckett, 83, Irish novelist, playwright, and short story writer, emphysema.
Howard Bowen, 81, American economist.
Theodore M. Burton, 82, American Mormon general authority.
Archie Campbell, 86, American baseball player.
Giorgio Cavallon, 85, Italian-American abstract artist.
Andrés do Barro, 42, Spanish musician, liver cancer.
John Harrison Finger, 74, American walker.
Harry Kraf, 82, American politician.
Anthony MacGregor Grier, 78, British colonial administrator.
Leslie Littlewood, 82-83, British trade unionist.
Vasile Milea, 62, Romanian general and politician, suicide.
Gustavo Pizarro, 73, Chilean footballer.
Massimo Serato, 73, Italian actor.

23
Jeff Alexander, 79, American composer, cancer.
Peter Bennett, 72, British actor.
John Cavendish, 5th Baron Chesham, 73, British politician and hereditary peer.
Alf Feebery, 80, English footballer.
Milko Gaydarski, 43, Bulgarian footballer.
Clem Hawke, 91, Australian politician, father of Bob Hawke, stroke.
Shahzad Khalil, 45, Pakistani television producer, cardiac arrest.
Lord Richard Percy, 68, English zoologist.
Richard Rado, 83, German-born British mathematician.
Lennart Strandberg, 74, Swedish Olympic sprinter (1936).

24
Victor Fontana, 41, Romanian Olympic biathlete (1972, 1976), shot.
Andor Kraszna-Krausz, 85, Hungarian-British publisher.
Charles Moore, 11th Earl of Drogheda, 79, British hereditary peer.
Ernest Nathan Morial, 60, American politician, heart attack.
Florică Murariu, 34, Romanian rugby player, shot.
Roger Pigaut, 70, French actor and film director.
Ollie Savatsky, 78, American football player.

25
Elena Ceaușescu, 73, Romanian communist politician, first lady (1974–1989) and deputy prime minister (1980–1989), execution by firing squad.
Nicolae Ceaușescu, 71, Romanian communist politician and dictator,president (1974–1989), execution by firing squad.
Gus Dahlström, 83, Swedish actor.
Betty Garde, 84, American actress.
Türkan Hanımsultan, 70, Ottoman princess and chemist.
George Hotchkiss, 83, American basketball coach.
Frederick F. Houser, 85, American politician.
Joseph Livingston, 84, American journalist.
Jean-Étienne Marie, 72, French composer.
Billy Martin, 61, American baseball player and manager, traffic collision.
Riccardo Morandi, 87, Italian bridge designer.
Robert Pirosh, 79, American screenwriter and director.
Bo Randall, 80, American knifemaker.
Wally Ris, 65, American Olympic swimmer (1948).
Sir Geoffrey Robson, 87, British naval admiral.
Domenico Scala, 86, Italian cinematographer.
Andreas Schei, 87, Norwegian judge.
A. J. Seymour, 75, Guyanese poet.
Sir Charles Trinder, 83, British businessman and politician.
D. K. Wilgus, 71, American musical scholar.

26
Lennox Berkeley, 86, English composer.
Sir Walter Bromley-Davenport, 86, British politician.
Sybil Cholmondeley, Marchioness of Cholmondeley, 95, British socialite.
Buck Crump, 85, Canadian businessman.
Denis Garrett, 83, British botanist.
Doug Harvey, 65, Canadian ice hockey player, cirrhosis.
Kōyō Ishikawa, 85, Japanese photographer.
Paul Jennings, 71, English author.
Roy Joiner, 83, American baseball player.
Martin W. Kellogg, 84, American painter.
K. P. Krishnakumar, 30-31, Indian artist, suicide.
Jörgen Lehmann, 91, Danish-born Swedish chemist.
James J. Manderino, 57, American politician, heart attack.
Maryon Pearson, 88, Canadian socialite.
K. Shankar Pillai, 87, Indian cartoonist.
Gregorius Radvenis, 86, Lithuanian air force pilot.
Shen Zijiu, 91, Chinese writer and politician.
Mohan Singh, 80, Indian general and politician.
Peggy Thorpe-Bates, 75, English actress.
Heinrich Vogel, 87, German theologian.
Seán Walsh, 64, Irish politician.
William Wyatt, 96, British Olympic weightlifter (1924).

27
Rodney Arismendi, 76, Uruguayan politician.
Kurt Baum, 89, Austrian-born American singer.
Maurice Dunkley, 75, English footballer.
Finlay Hart, 87-88, Scottish politician.
Petrus Johannes Idenburg, 91, Dutch jurist.
Gene Johnson, 87, American sports coach.
Dada Amir Haider Khan, 89, Pakistani communist activist.
Gerard Maarse, 60, Dutch Olympic speed skater (1952, 1956).
Meliton, Metropolitan of Chalcedon, 75-76, Turkish Eastern Orthodox prelate.
Arthur Rhames, 32, American musician, AIDS.
Walter Rose, 77, German footballer.
David Shaw, 37, British painter.
Branko Tretinjak, 82, Yugoslav Olympic fencer (1936).
Ron Ulmer, 76, New Zealand racing cyclist.
George William Weidler, 63, American songwriter.

28
George Andrews, 85, Welsh rugby player.
Solomon Birnbaum, 98, Austrian-Canadian linguist and paleographer.
Marin Ceaușescu, 73, Romanian economist and diplomat, brother of Nicolae Ceaușescu, suicide by hanging.
Earl Patrick Freeman, 57, Canadian professional wrestler, heart attack.
Muriel Gammans, 91, British politician.
Karl Humenberger, 83, Austrian footballer.
Ave Kaplan, 90, American football player.
Pavel Kurochkin, 89, Soviet soldier.
Fred Lange-Nielsen, 70, Norwegian doctor and musician.
Ricardo López Méndez, 86, Mexican poet and lyricist.
Valentina Galaktionovna Morozova, 79, Soviet geologist and paleontologist.
Hermann Oberth, 95, Austro-Hungarian-born German physicist and  aeronautic engineer.
Ian Parry, 24, British photojournalist, plane crash.
Charles Rinker, 78, American lyricist.
William Scott, 76, Northern Irish artist.
Sharp Edge, 19, British Thoroughbred racehorse.

29
Süreyya Ağaoğlu, 86, Turkish writer and lawyer.
Adrien Albert, 82, Australian chemist.
Scott Burton, 50, American sculptor, AIDS.
Stanley Carnell, 86, Canadian politician.
Saman Piyasiri Fernando, 31, Sri Lankan politician, murdered.
Hap Glaudi, 77, American sportscaster, lung cancer.
Guy Hershberger, 93, American theologian.
Hiroshi Inoue, 57, Japanese botanist.
Marion Keisker, 72, American record producer, first person to record Elvis Presley.
Hubert Levigne, 84, Dutch artist.
Rita Rait-Kovaleva, 91, Soviet literary translator.
Endel Ruberg, 72, Estonian-Canadian artist.
Ive Šubic, 67, Yugoslav artist.
Saša Večtomov, 59, Czechoslovak cellist.

30
Sten Abel, 90, Norwegian Olympic sailor (1920).
Øyvind Anker, 85, Norwegian librarian.
Charles H. Blosser, 94, American airport executive and politician.
Augusto Del Noce, 79, Italian philosopher.
Erich Kauer, 81, German footballer.
George Kupka, 77, American politician.
Etienne Leroux, 67, South African writer.
Esther McCoy, 85, American architectural historian.
Yasuji Miyazaki, 73, Japanese Olympic swimmer.
Fumiteru Nakano, 74, Japanese tennis player.
Madoline Thomas, 99, Welsh actress.

31
Christia Adair, 96, American suffragist and civil rights activist.
Ed Bogdanski, 68, American basketball player.
Lilly Daché, 97, French-born American hatmaker.
Georges de Bourguignon, 79, Belgian Olympic fencer (1948).
Margaret Gordon, 50, British illustrator (The Wombles), bronchopneumonia.
Clarence Hammar, 90, Swedish Olympic sailor (1924, 1928).
Ignatius Kilage, 48, Papua New Guinean politician, governor-general (since 1989).
Mihály Lantos, 61, Hungarian football player and manager.
Francis B. Loomis Jr., 86, American general.
Wendell Mosley, 57, American football player.
David Mackenzie, 67, Scottish trade unionist.
Bendt Rothe, 68, Danish actor.
Gerhard Schröder, 79, West German politician.

References 

1989-12
 12